The ISAF Youth Sailing World Championships was first held in Sweden in 1971 and it has been held every year since. It is one of the key events of the federation to help promote top-level youth participation.

Editions

Equipment

Gender Guide
O  (Open)
(2) (Open) in two age bands 
B  (Boys)
G  (Girls)
Mx  (Mixed) Male and Female Pair
BM  (Boys/Mixed) Male/Male Pair or a Male/Female Pair

Results

29er

Open

Boys

Girls

420

Open

Boys

Boys & Mixed

Girls

470

Byte

Europe

Fireball

Flipper

Formula Kite

Boys

Girls

Hobie 16

IQFoil

Boys

Girls

Laser

Laser Radial

Boys

Girls

Laser 2

Mistral

Nacra 15

RS:X

Boys

Girls

SL 16

Techno 293

Boys

Girls

References

External links
 

World Sailing
Youth
Youth sailing
World youth sports competitions